Notoglanidium depierrei is a species of catfish (order Siluriformes) family Claroteidae. This species is endemic to Cameroon where it is known only from its type locality of the Sanaga River Basin. It reaches a length of about 17.2 centimetres (6.8 in) SL. It was formerly considered to be the sole member of the monotypic genus Platyglanis but this has now been synonymised with Notoglanidium.

References

Endemic fauna of Cameroon
Claroteidae
Fish of Africa
Taxa named by Jacques Daget
Fish described in 1979